Claude Scott-Mitchell (born 1997/1998) is an Australian actress based in London. She is known for her roles in the film The Dry (2020) and the series Hotel Portofino (2022).

Early life
Scott-Mitchell was born in Canberra and grew up in the Marrickville suburb of Sydney's Inner West. She is from an artistic family, her father Michael a stage production designer and her mother a model. She attended the Newtown High School of the Performing Arts.

Career
Scott-Mitchell began her career as a child actress on stage, appearing in Elke Neidhardt's 2008 Opera Australia production of Don Giovanni and Sergei Tcherkasski's production of Flight at the Parade Theatre in 2010.

Scott-Mitchell resumed her career in 2019 with a small role as Gretchen McGrath in the miniseries Reckoning. She made her film debut the following year playing a young version of Genevieve O'Reilly's character in Robert Connolly's The Dry, an adaptation of the novel by Jane Harper. She also had a recurring role that year in series 2 of the Sky One comedy-drama Brassic as Sara, a love interest of Dylan (Damien Molony). Scott-Mitchell joined the main cast as Rose Drummond-Ward in the period drama Hotel Portofino, which premiered on BritBox in 2022. Later that year, she starred alongside Richard Roxburgh in The Tempest at the Roslyn Packer Theatre, for which she received a Sydney Theatre Award nomination.

Filmography

Stage

Awards and nominations

References

External links
 
 Claude Scott-Mitchell at Independent Talent

Living people
1990s births
21st-century Australian actresses
Actresses from Canberra
Australian expatriate actresses in the United Kingdom
Australian expatriates in England
People from Marrickville
Year of birth missing (living people)